Buxton is a city in Traill County, North Dakota, United States. The population was 348 at the 2020 census. Buxton was founded in 1880. Today, it has become a bedroom community for the nearby Greater Grand Forks metropolitan area.

History
Buxton was founded in 1880 in Buxton Township as a townsite along the Great Northern Railroad in 1880. The post office began operating in November of that year. It was incorporated as a village in 1922. It became a city in 1967, after the North Dakota Legislature enacted legislation that eliminated all existing incorporation titles for towns and villages in the state.

The town was named after Thomas J. Buxton, who at the time was the city treasurer in Minneapolis, Minnesota. Buxton was a close friend and business associated of the town's founder, Budd Reeve.

Geography
Buxton is located at  (47.603230, -97.099770).

Demographics

2020 census
As of the 2020 census, the population was 348.

2010 census
As of the census of 2010, there were 323 people, 136 households, and 91 families residing in the city. The racial makeup of the city was 99.4% White, 0.3% African American, and 0.3% Native American. Hispanic or Latino of any race were 0.9% of the population.

There were 136 households, of which 30.9% had children under the age of 18 living with them, 59.6% were married couples living together, 2.9% had a female householder with no husband present, 4.4% had a male householder with no wife present, and 33.1% were non-families. 28.7% of all households were made up of individuals, and 13.9% had someone living alone who was 65 years of age or older. The average household size was 2.38 and the average family size was 2.97.

The median age in the city was 39.4 years. 23.2% of residents were under the age of 18; 7.7% were between the ages of 18 and 24; 28.9% were from 25 to 44; 26.7% were from 45 to 64; and 13.6% were 65 years of age or older. The gender makeup of the city was 51.4% male and 48.6% female.

2000 census
As of the census of 2000, there were 350 people, 133 households, and 96 families residing in the city. The population density was 1,735.1 people per square mile (675.7/km2). There were 141 housing units at an average density of 699.0 per square mile (272.2/km2). The racial makeup of the city was 98.00% White, 0.29% Asian, 1.43% from other races, and 0.29% from two or more races. Hispanic or Latino of any race were 1.71% of the population.

There were 133 households, out of which 39.1% had children under the age of 18 living with them, 65.4% were married couples living together, 5.3% had a female householder with no husband present, and 27.8% were non-families. 26.3% of all households were made up of individuals, and 12.0% had someone living alone who was 65 years of age or older. The average household size was 2.63 and the average family size was 3.22.

In the city, the population was spread out, with 32.0% under the age of 18, 5.1% from 18 to 24, 29.7% from 25 to 44, 21.4% from 45 to 64, and 11.7% who were 65 years of age or older. The median age was 34 years. For every 100 females, there were 92.3 males. For every 100 females age 18 and over, there were 91.9 males.

The median income for a household in the city was $40,694, and the median income for a family was $48,333. Males had a median income of $26,875 versus $22,143 for females. The per capita income for the city was $16,232. None of the families and 2.9% of the population were living below the poverty line, including no under eighteens and 9.8% of those over 64.

Mancur Olson  Economist

· Only people who already have a Wikipedia article may appear here. This establishes notability.
· The article must mention how they are associated with <city name>, whether born, raised, or residing.
· The fact of their association should have a reliable source cited.
· Alphabetical by last name please.
· All others will be deleted.

 Asle J. Gronna, Senator
 Ragnvald Nestos, Governor of North Dakota 1921-1925
 Kemper Nomland, architect
 Arthur G. Sorlie, Governor of North Dakota 1925-1928

References

Cities in North Dakota
Cities in Traill County, North Dakota
Populated places established in 1880
1880 establishments in Dakota Territory